Thyroid hormone-inducible hepatic protein is a protein that in humans is encoded by the THRSP gene.

The protein encoded by this gene is similar to the gene product of S14, a rat gene whose expression is limited to liver and adipose tissue and is controlled by nutritional and hormonal factors.

This gene has been shown to be expressed in liver and adipocytes, particularly in lipomatous modules. It is also found to be expressed in lipogenic breast cancers, which suggests a role in controlling tumor lipid metabolism.

Previously, THRSP was among the identified upregulated genes in the prefrontal cortex of spontaneously hypertensive rats (SHR/NCrl) and Wistar-Kyoto (WKY/NCrl) rats which exhibited inattention behavior. Subsequently, overexpression of THRSP induced inattention, but not hyperactive and impulsive behavior in mice, suggesting that this gene plays a role in the inattention phenotype of ADHD.

References

Further reading